Two Sigma Investments is a New York City-based hedge fund that uses a variety of technological methods, including artificial intelligence, machine learning, and distributed computing, for its trading strategies. The firm is run by John Overdeck and David Siegel.

History

Two Sigma Investments was founded in 2001 by John Overdeck, David Siegel and Mark Pickard. Siegel is a computer science Ph.D. from the Massachusetts Institute of Technology and held the position of Chief Information Officer for D. E. Shaw & Co. prior to starting Two Sigma. Overdeck is an International Mathematical Olympiad Silver Medalist who subsequently studied mathematics at Stanford University and then rose to the position of Managing Director at D. E. Shaw prior to leaving to co-found Two Sigma. Pickard served as the President of the firm from its inception until his retirement in 2006.

According to Two Sigma, the firm's name was chosen to reflect the duality of the word sigma. A lower case sigma, σ, designates the volatility of an investment's return over a given benchmark, and an upper case sigma, Σ, denotes sum. By adding together the volatilities of individual positions measured against the benchmark, Two Sigma can amplify forecast signals, the company's website says.

In October 2013, Two Sigma Private Investments announced that it was joining with Stephen Hannahs to form Wings Capital Partners, a commercial aviation private equity, investment, advisory and financing company. In July 2014, it was announced that Simon Yates, Citigroup's global head of equity derivative sales and trading, left the bank to join Two Sigma.

In February 2014, Forbes reported that former Two Sigma employee Kang Gao, aged 29, was prosecuted by the Manhattan District Attorney and is accused of using a remote-access device to view Two Sigma's proprietary trading models and emailing this information to his personal email account, lifting quantitative trading strategies, trading models, a marketing presentation, and a scientific white paper. The case, New York. v. Kang Gao, led to Gao receiving 8 months in jail as of October 2014. In February 2015, Gao pleaded guilty to "illegally accessing and duplicating proprietary and confidential information related to the firm's trading methods."

In 2016, Two Sigma Investments ranked 11th on Penta's Top 100 Hedge Funds.

As of early 2017, Two Sigma had used crowdsourcing options to find trading signals. By March 2017, the fund was running a competition on Kaggle to code a trading algorithm. 

The fund managed around $8 billion in November 2011, $23 billion in October 2014, and $32 billion by the end of 2015. , the fund had assets reaching more than $50 billion.  In May 2019, the fund had assets reaching $60 billion. This number slightly dropped to $58 billion in October 2020, after Two Sigma saw losses in its risk premia, absolute return, and macro funds.

Technology 
At the end of 2016, Two Sigma Investments introduced an artificial intelligence challenge called Halite. Halite is a programming game inviting coding enthusiasts to build smart bots whose goal is to gain control of a virtual grid. Due to the success of Halite I, Two Sigma decided to develop a second season of Halite called Halite II. This ran from October 2017 to January 2018, and in this version players competed for control of planets using ships. In October 2022, Two Sigma became a Chainlink node operator to help expand the use cases of blockchain-based hybrid smart contracts.

Fund information

Two Sigma has been noted in the business press for its unusually high rate of return, comparable to its older and more mature competitors D. E. Shaw & Co. and Renaissance Technologies. In October 2014, Two Sigma had raised $3.3 billion for a macro hedge fund in one of the largest new pools of such capital raised since the 2008 financial crisis.

There are a few specialized divisions which focus on private investments, venture capital investments (with a focus on companies operating in the realm of data science), advising institutional clients, and running a high frequency broker-dealer.

References

External links
 
 Two Sigma Ventures

Hedge fund firms in New York City
Financial services companies established in 2001